Tombouctou may be:
 Tombouctou Region in northern Mali
 The French name for the city of Timbuktu, which gives its name to the region